Coustou is the name of a family of French sculptors:
Nicolas Coustou (1658–1733)
Guillaume Coustou the Elder (1677–1746)
Guillaume Coustou the Younger (1716–1777)